The Rockhampton National School was a school in Rockhampton, Queensland.

On February 15, 1859, there was a meeting of those appointed as the Rockhampton School and Church committee, over which the Sub-Collector of Customs, Henry Lumsden, presided, when it was resolved to erect a school building, 40 ft (12.3m) long and 20 ft (6.15m) wide in which Divine service could also be held on Sundays.

The building having been completed, it was opened for business on August 16, 1859, F K Milne, afterwards the first town clerk, being appointed schoolmaster, each scholar to pay 1/6 (1 shilling and 6 pence) (or 18 pence) per week. Thus a day a school was started, the population being only a few hundreds, principally men.

By May 1860, it was found that the school building was not large enough, and it was resolved to petition the new Queensland Government for a site for a public school. This request was granted and the allotments at the corner of William and Denison Streets was granted-where the  Rockhampton Special School now stands.

References
 Bird, J. T. S.; Early History of Rockhampton 1920
 History of Central Boys School Rockhampton

Educational institutions established in 1859
Schools in Rockhampton
Defunct schools in Queensland
1859 establishments in Australia